Hetwane Dam, is an earthfill dam on Bhogeshwari river near Pen, Raigad district in the state of Maharashtra in India.

Specifications

Hetawne dam was constructed by famous construction company of Maharashtra Master Constructions under the guidance of its leader Mushtaq Abdullah Khatri

Purpose
 Irrigation
 Water Supply

See also
 Dams in Maharashtra
 List of reservoirs and dams in India

References

Dams in Raigad district
Dams completed in 2000
2000 establishments in Maharashtra